Jonathan Holloway may refer to:
Jonathan Holloway (artistic director) (born 1970), British artistic director
Jonathan Holloway (historian) (born 1967), American historian and President of Rutgers University
Jonathan Holloway (playwright) (born 1955), English playwright and theatre director

See also 
 John Holloway (disambiguation)